Croix-Moligneaux is a commune in the Somme department in Hauts-de-France in northern France.

Geography

The Seine-Nord canal will be dug near Croix-Moligneaux. As part of the preparatory  works more than one hundred archaeological sites were identified by some fifty archaeologists around Croix-Moligneaux. The finds range from the Middle Paleolithic to the Middle Ages. These include a Roman road and numerous villas as well as a funerary monument from the Bronze Age.

The village name derives from a gallows erected here in Gallo-Roman times. The gallows was called by the Latin term of cruces which then translates into "cruci" (cross).

The village already has the status of parish on a document from the tenth century. This is confirmed in 1015 when Hardouin de Croÿ donated the land and the altar (altaria de crucibus) to the canons of Noyon.

Land Marks
The church of Saint Médard, built in the 12th century is in a  Romanesque / Gothic transition style. The original tower collapsed and was rebuilt in the 17th century, then again, after the destruction of the First World War. The current choir dates from the 13th century. The remarkable Renaissance porch (sixteenth century) backs onto the second bay of the south aisle.  The south portal is listed as a historic monument.
The interior offers very beautiful stained-glass windows.
Monument dedicated to Lieutenant Georges Feltz, French aviator, and his radio, Second Master Albert Nelias, shot down in the town on May 20, 1940 by the German fighter during the Battle of France.
Old dovecote.

Population

See also
 Communes of the Somme department

References

Communes of Somme (department)